Natalya Spiridonova (born 31 July 2002) is a Russian athlete who specializes in the high jump, she however competes as part of the authorized neutral athletes. She was the gold medallist at the World Athletics U20 Championships in 2021.

References

External links 
 Natalya Spiridonova at World Athletics

2002 births
Living people
World Athletics U20 Championships winners
Russian high jumpers